Paul Baines (born 15 January 1972) is an English former footballer who played in the Football League for Stoke City.

Career
Baines progressed through the youth ranks at the Victoria Ground and towards the end of the 1990–91 season with the club experiencing a terrible season he was handed his professional debut away at Birmingham City by caretaker manager Graham Paddon. He also played in the next away match at Cambridge United.

Career statistics

A.  The "Other" column constitutes appearances and goals in the Football League Trophy.

References

External links
 

English footballers
Stoke City F.C. players
Tamworth F.C. players
English Football League players
1972 births
Living people
Atherstone Town F.C. players
Association football forwards
Sportspeople from Tamworth, Staffordshire